is a Japanese word that is generally synonymous with the English term . Today, this word usually refers to spirits from Western legends, but occasionally it may also denote a creature from native Japanese folklore. For example, according to an old folk belief from Iwate Prefecture, it was once feared that the yōsei could resurrect the dead. It is also mentioned that the people of Mt. Hōrai are small fairies that have no knowledge of great evil and so their hearts never grow old. The Ainu also tell of a race of small people known as the Koro-pok-guru in their folklore. Another fairy-like being from Japan is the Kijimuna, tree sprites told in the Ryukyuan religion of Okinawa.

See also

References
 
 

Fairies
Japanese folklore
Japanese ghosts
Japanese mythology
Japanese religious terminology
Yōkai